Socialist Youth International (in German: Sozialistische Jugend-Internationale, French: L'Internationale de la Jeunesse Socialiste) was an international union of socialist youth organisations. It was founded in Hamburg 1923, through the merger of the Young Workers' International and the International Community of Socialist Youth Organisations. The formation of SYI was parallel to what of the Labour and Socialist International, and LSI and SYI were closely connected.

The headquarters of SYI were set up in Berlin. In 1933, it shifted to Prague, and in 1938 to Paris.

During the Second World War SYI became dormant. It was later replaced by the International Union of Socialist Youth.

See also
 Estonian Young Socialist League

Youth wings of political parties

Youth organizations established in 1923